Happy People/U Saved Me is the sixth studio album and the second double album by American R&B singer R. Kelly, where he mixed feel-good danceable soul records (Happy People) with gospel anthems (U Saved Me). Released in 2004, it peaked at No. 2 on the pop albums chart and went on to be certified three times Platinum. The album contained the hit single "Happy People" (US No. 19, UK No. 6), and the minor hit "U Saved Me" (US No. 52, UK No. 6). On "Red Carpet (Pause, Flash)," Kelly sampled the song "Step in the Name of Love" on his previous album, which was released a year earlier.

Critical reception

Happy People/U Saved Me received mostly positive reviews. The Los Angeles Times said, "Charming, unpretentious and effortless, the singer presides over a party whose pace never flags and whose soul is fun-loving and wholesome." Uncut said, "Happy People is a cunning, crackling, can't-keep-still classic." However many found his gospel/Christian based songs to be at stark contrast to his legal history.

Commercial performance
In his home country of the United States, Happy People/U Saved Me debuted at number two on the Billboard 200, selling 264,000 copies in its first week, behind Tim McGraw's Live Like You Were Dying. The album was the sixth consecutive Kelly solo album (seventh overall) to debut at number one on the Billboard Top R&B/Hip-Hop Albums. In its second week, the album remained in the top ten at Billboard 200, falling to number six, selling 127,000 copies. On September 24, 2004, the double album has been certified 3× platinum by the Recording Industry Association of America (RIAA), for shipping more than 3 million units (in this case, 1.5 million double album sets, which are double-counted by the RIAA). As of December 6, 2011, Happy People/U Saved Me has sold 5.2 million copies worldwide.

Track listing
All songs written, produced and arranged by R. Kelly.

Credits and personnel
Credits adapted from AllMusic.

 Delatrice Alexander – choir, chorus
 Michael Avery – choir, chorus
 Steve Bearsley – assistant, engineer, main personnel, programming
 George I. III Broughton – choir, chorus
 Kim Burrell – featured artist, primary artist
 Jeff Chestek – string engineer
 Joan Collaso – choir, chorus
 Dee Dee – illustrations
 Rodney East – keyboards, main personnel
 Felicia Coleman Evans – choir, chorus
 Sonya Frank – choir, chorus
 Kimberly Ann Franklin – choir, chorus
 Yvonne Gage – choir, chorus
 Andy Gallas - assistant, audio engineer, engineer, main personnel, programming
 Abel Garibaldi – audio engineer, engineer, main personnel, mixing, programming, vocals, background vocals
 Omar Gilbert – unknown contributor role
 Senabelle Gill – choir, chorus
 Larry Gold – conductor, string arrangements
 Dejah Gomez – choir, chorus
 Pastor Chris Sr. Harris – choir, chorus
 Brandon Hull – assistant
 Earickia L. Isom – hair stylist
 R. Kelly – arranger, audio production, composer, main personnel, mixing, primary artist, producer, string arrangements, vocals
 Gregg Landfair – guitar
 Donnie Lyle – bass, bass instrument, guitar, main personnel, vocals, background vocals

 Paul Mabin – choir, chorus
 Maurice Mahon – featured artist, primary artist
 John McGlinchey – assistant
 Ian Mereness – engineer, main personnel, mixing, programming
 Jason Mlodzinski – assistant, engineer, main personnel, programming
 Peter Mokran – audio engineer, engineer
 Jeffrey Morrow – choir, chorus
 Jackie Murphy – art direction, design
 Lori Holton Nash – choir, chorus
 Kendall D. Nesbitt – keyboards, main personnel, vocals
 Armirris Palmore – choir, chorus
 Lauren Pilot – choir, chorus
 Herb Powers – mastering
 Kelly Price – featured artist, guest artist, main personnel, primary artist, vocals
 Riesig & Taylor – photography
 Montez Roberts – assistant
 Stevie Robinson – choir, chorus
 David Ross – set design
 Johnny Rutledge – choir, chorus
 Cristino Sanchez – choir, chorus
 Roberta Thomas – choir, chorus
 Devin B. Thompson – choir, chorus
 Uncle Life – main personnel, vocals, background vocals
 Seth Waldman – assistant
 Pamela Watson – stylist
 Nathan Wheeler – assistant, engineer, main personnel, programming, vocals, background vocals

Charts

Weekly charts

Year-end charts

Certifications

See also
List of number-one R&B albums of 2004 (U.S.)

References

2004 albums
R. Kelly albums
Albums produced by R. Kelly